La Gitana means "the gypsy" in Spanish and may refer to the following:

 Nickname for Jennifer Lopez
 La Gitana for Violin & Piano (after an 18th-century Arabo-Spanish Gypsy song) composed by Fritz Kreisler